Clearfield County Courthouse is a historic courthouse located in Clearfield, Pennsylvania, United States.  It is located directly across from another historic landmark, the Dimeling Hotel.  It is a -story brick structure constructed in 1860 in the Second Empire style.  An addition was completed in 1884. It features a square brick clock tower with a bell shaped roof.

It was listed on the National Register of Historic Places in 1979.

See also 
 National Register of Historic Places listings in Clearfield County, Pennsylvania
 List of state and county courthouses in Pennsylvania

References 
 

County courthouses in Pennsylvania
Courthouses on the National Register of Historic Places in Pennsylvania
Second Empire architecture in Pennsylvania
Government buildings completed in 1860
Buildings and structures in Clearfield County, Pennsylvania
Clock towers in Pennsylvania
National Register of Historic Places in Clearfield County, Pennsylvania